San Felipe Creek is a stream in Imperial and San Diego Counties of California.  It arises in the Volcan Mountains of San Diego County , and runs eastward, gathering the waters of most of the eastern slope of the mountains and desert of the county before it empties into the Salton Sea.  It is probably the last remaining perennial natural desert stream in the Colorado Desert region. In 1974, the San Felipe Creek Area was designated as a National Natural Landmark by the National Park Service.

Watershed of San Felipe Creek
San Felipe Creek
Carrizo Creek, Carrizo Wash
Barret Canyon
Deguynos Canyon
Gert Wash 
Red Rock Canyon (Deguynos Canyon)
Vallecito Creek, Vallecito Wash
Arroyo Seco del Diablo 
Arroyo Tapiado
Arroyo Hueso
Canebreak Wash
North Wash
June Wash
Squaw Canyon Wash
Bisnaga Alta Wash
Smuggler Canyon
Storm Canyon Wash
Cottonwood Canyon
Box Canyon Wash 
Oriflamme Canyon
Rodriquez Canyon
Bow Willow Creek
Rockhouse Canyon
Carrizo Gorge
Goat Canyon
Tule Canyon
Walker Canyon (Carrizo Creek)
Tarantula Wash
Fish Creek Wash
Palo Verde Wash
Harper Canyon Wash
Fault Wash
Third Wash
Big Wash
Hills of the Moon Wash
Rainbow Wash
Borrego Sink Wash
Borrego Sink
Culp Canyon Wash
Tubb Canyon
Borrego Palm Canyon Wash
Hellhole Canyon
Henderson Canyon
Borrego Palm Canyon
Coyote Creek
Indian Creek
Salvadore Canyon Creek
Alder Canyon Creek
Horse Canyon Creek
Tule Canyon Creek
Alder Canyon Creek
Nance Canyon Creek
Pinyon Wash
Bighorn Wash
Nolina Wash
Mine Wash
Chuckwalla Wash 
Grapevine Canyon
Bitter Creek Canyon
Banner Creek

References

External links
San Felipe Creek Ecological Reserve at California Department of Fish and Wildlife
San Sebastian Marsh/San Felipe Creek at the Bureau of Land Management

Rivers of San Diego County, California
Rivers of Imperial County, California
Rivers of Southern California
National Natural Landmarks in California